Adolph Andreas "Lefty" Lorenzen (January 12, 1893 – March 5, 1963) was a Major League Baseball pitcher who played in one game for the Detroit Tigers on September 12, . He pitched in two innings, and allowed four hits and four runs.

External links

1893 births
1963 deaths
Detroit Tigers players
Major League Baseball pitchers
Baseball players from Iowa
Ottumwa Packers players
Chattanooga Lookouts players
Fort William-Port Arthur Canucks players
Rock Island Islanders players
Galesburg Pavers players